Sahali (or Sa-hali) is a neighbourhood in South Kamloops, British Columbia, Canada, bordered by the Aberdeen and Downtown districts. It is home to most of Kamloops' major grocery and big box stores. It is also site of one of British Columbia's newest universities: Thompson Rivers University. The neighbourhood is the largest in Kamloops and consists of an Upper and Lower Sahali, with an estimated total population of about 12,000 in 2003.

The neighbourhood's name derives from the word sahali, a local version of the Chinook Jargon word usually seen as saghalie in published lexicons of the Jargon.  Its basic meaning is 'up' or 'above' but in this context meaning 'high ground'. Sahali is situated on high ground overlooking the valley of the Thompson River.

Several schools are located in Sahali, including Sa-Hali Secondary School, the neighbourhood's only high school. The elementary schools in Sahali are:
 Summit Elementary School
 South Sa-Hali Elementary School (A French immersion school)
 McGowan Park Elementary School
 Kamloops Open Online Learning Education Center (An online school)
Sahali Secondary School

Featuring unique and expansive natural landscapes, Sa-Hali is a sub-rural area.

References
 https://web.archive.org/web/20050306013040/http://www.city.kamloops.bc.ca/planning/pdfs/population.pdf
 

Neighbourhoods in Kamloops
Chinook Jargon place names